Nanabhai Bhatt (12 June 1915 – 24 April 1999) was an Indian film director and producer who worked in Hindi and Gujarati cinema. He is known for making over a hundred fantasy and mythological films, including Mr. X (1957), Zimbo Comes to Town (1960), Lal Qila (1960) and the blockbuster Kangan (1959) starring Nirupa Roy and Ashok Kumar.  His first film, Muqabala (1942), was the first to feature the double-role or "twins" phenomenon in Indian cinema, wherein lead actress Fearless Nadia alternated between the good sister and the gangster's moll. The formula was subsequently emulated in numerous Hindi films.

Early life and career
Bhatt, called Yeshwant Bhatt, was born in a Nagar Brahmin family on 12 June 1915 in Porbandar, British India.  He started his early career in films as a sound recordist with Prakash Pictures, working under his brother Balwant Bhatt, and then by writing "scripts and stories" using the name Batuk Bhatt. He began his directorial venture when he joined  Homi Wadia's team at Basant Pictures by co-directing two films with Babubhai Mistri, Muqabala (1942) and Mauj (1943), under the same name. He directed two more films as Batuk Bhatt, Homi Wadia's Hunterwali Ki Beti (1943) and Liberty Pictures Sudhar (1949). Bhatt left Basant Pictures and started his own production company "Deepak Pictures" in 1946.

Personal life
Bhatt was the patriarch of the Bhatt film family. He had five daughters and four sons, including film director and producer Mahesh Bhatt, Mukesh Bhatt, and Robin Bhatt.

Bhatt died at Nanavati hospital in Mumbai from heart failure on 24 April 1999.

Filmography

Producer
Kabzaa (1985)

Director
Jaya Parvati Vrat (Gujarati film) (1982)
Gajara Maru (Gujarati film) (1981)
Dharti Mata (1976)
Balak Aur Janwar (1975)
Jeevan Rekha (1974)
Jung Aur Aman (1968)
Baghdad Ki Raatein (1967)
Shankar Khan (1966)
Bekhabar (1965)
Aadhi Raat Ke Baad (1965)
Samson (1964)
Alapiranthavan (1963)
Bhootnath (1963)
Naag Rani (1963)
Rocket Girl (1962)
Baghdad Ki Raaten (1962)
Teen Ustad (1961)
Police Detective (1960)
Lal Quila (1960)
Zimbo Shaher Mein (1960)
Daaka (1959)
Baazigar (1959)
Kangan (1959)
Naya Sansar (1959)
Madam XYZ (1959)
Son of Sinbad (1958)
Chaalbaaz (1958)
Mr. X (1957)
Ustad (1957)
Kismet (1956)
Watan (1954)
Toote Khilone (1954)
Sinbad Jahazi (1952)
Apni Izzat (1952)
Baghdad (1952)
Lakshmi Narayan (1951)
Ram Janma (1951)
Daman (1951)
Lav Kush (1951)
Janmashtami (1950)
Veer Babruwahan (1950)
Hamara Ghar (1950)
Veer Ghatotkach (1949)
Shaukeen (1949)
Maa Baap Ki Laaj (1946)
Chalis Karod (1946)
Mauj (1943)
Muqabala (1942)

References

External links
 

1915 births
1999 deaths
People from Porbandar
Film producers from Gujarat
Hindi-language film directors
Gujarati people
Nanabhai
20th-century Indian film directors
Film directors from Gujarat